A cannon is any large tubular firearm designed to fire a heavy projectile over a considerable distance. It can also refer to the device propelling a human cannonball.

Cannon may also refer to:

Places

Greenland 
Cape Cannon

The Moon 
Cannon (crater)

United Kingdom 
Cannons (house), an 18th-century palace built for the Duke of Chandos in Stanmore
Cannon Street, London
Cannon Street station

United States 
Cannon, Delaware
Cannon, Kentucky
Cannon Beach, Oregon
Cannon City, Minnesota
Cannon County, Tennessee
Cannon Falls, Minnesota
Cannon Falls Township, Minnesota
Cannon Mountain (New Hampshire)
Cannon River (Minnesota)
Cannon Township, Michigan
Cannon Township, Kittson County, Minnesota

Businesses
Cannon (ITT Corporation), a manufacturer of cables, switches and connectors
Cannon (automobile), an automobile produced from 1902 to 1906
Cannon Mills, a textile manufacturer
Cannon Films, a now-defunct motion picture studio
CannonDesign, an architectural firm founded in 1945

Media
Cannon (TV series), a 1971–1976 American TV series
Heroes, Inc. Presents Cannon, a comic book
Cannon, a 1971 premier TV movie starring William Conrad

Music
Il Cannone Guarnerius, The Cannon, violin made by Giuseppe Antonio Guarneri in 1743
Cannon depth drums, tom-tom and bass drums deeper than power depth
Cannon (band), a post rock band from Glasgow, Scotland, active between 1999 and 2003
Cannons (band), an indie pop band from Los Angeles
Cannons (album), a 2007 album recorded by INO Records artist Phil Wickham
"Cannon", a 1995 single by American pop/rock band Self from Subliminal Plastic Motives
"Cannon", a song by the White Stripes from their self-titled album
"Cannons", a song by Youth Lagoon from his debut album The Year of Hibernation

Other uses
Cannon (surname)
Cannon Air Force Base, New Mexico, US
Cannon bone, a bone in the forelimb of a horse
Cannon School, a private school in North Carolina, US
Great Cannon, a cyberweapon used by the Chinese government
Old Jeremiah, British naval gun, affectionately referred to as The Cannon
USS Cannon (DE-99), a 1943 World War II United States destroyer
Hail cannon, a shock wave generator claimed to disrupt the formation of hailstones in the atmosphere
Ohio Cannon, a professional American football team in 1999
Cannon, a British/Canadian term for a snooker or billiards shot

See also
Canon (disambiguation)
Cannon or XLR connector
Cannon Lake (disambiguation)
Cannons Creek (disambiguation)